"Moonlight Becomes You" is a popular song composed by Jimmy Van Heusen with lyrics by Johnny Burke. The song was written for the Paramount Pictures release Road to Morocco (1942) and published in 1942 in connection with the film. Vic Schoen (staff arranger for Paramount) wrote the arrangement.

The song has been recorded many times, becoming a standard, but the recording by Bing Crosby on June 12, 1942  is the best known. This topped the Billboard charts in 1942 and spent a total of 17 weeks in the lists.

Other recordings
Chet Baker covered the tune in his album My Funny Valentine (1980).
Dick Haymes - included in his 1956 album Moondreams. 
Ella Fitzgerald - Verve release Get Happy! (1959), with Herb Ellis on guitar and Lou Levy on piano
Engelbert Humperdinck on his album The Very Thought of You (1995).
Frank Sinatra recorded the song for his Moonlight Sinatra album (1966).
Nora Aunor Her winning song in 1967 Tawag ng Tanghalan Championship.
Glenn Miller Orchestra - their 1942 recording reached No. 5 in the Billboard charts the same year.
Bobby Hackett - 1965 album of the same name 
Harry James and His Orchestra - their recording reached No. 15 in the Billboard charts in 1942. .
The Hi-Lo's - included in the 1957 album Ring Around Rosie
Jack Jones - included in his 1961 album Lollipops and Roses. 
Jerry Vale - included in his 1959 album The Same Old Moon.
Johnny Mathis - included in his 1959 album Heavenly.
Mel Tormé - in his 1994 album A Tribute to Bing Crosby.
Michael Holliday - included in the 1962 album To Bing - From Mike.
Val Doonican - included in the 1982 album Val Sings Bing.
Paul Williams Recorded this song for his 1979 album A Little on the Windy Side.
Seth MacFarlane - in his 2017 album In Full Swing

Popular culture
A clip of the song by Julie Morgan was also featured in Star Trek: First Contact, also a Paramount film.
The Glenn Miller Orchestra version of the song. sung by Skip Nelson, is featured in a dance sequence in the New York City immersive theater production Sleep No More.

References

External links
"Moonlight Becomes You" at Jazz Standards

1942 songs
1943 singles
Bing Crosby songs
Dorothy Lamour songs
Pop standards
Songs written for films
Songs with music by Jimmy Van Heusen
Songs with lyrics by Johnny Burke (lyricist)
Mel Tormé songs
Ella Fitzgerald songs
Engelbert Humperdinck songs
Frank Sinatra songs
Glenn Miller songs
Jack Jones (singer) songs
Jerry Vale songs
Johnny Mathis songs
Songs about the Moon